To Vima is a Greek weekly newspaper first published in 1922 by Dimitris Lambrakis, the father of Christos Lambrakis, as Elefthero Vima (Free Tribune).

It was owned by Lambrakis Press Group (DOL), a group that also publishes the newspaper Ta Nea, among others in its fold of publications. The assets of DOL were acquired in 2017 by Alter Ego Media S.A. To Vima is a high-quality newspaper in Greece, and arguably the most influential in political issues; it was published daily until 2011, but since publishes only its flagship Sunday edition, whose current managing editor is Stavros Psycharis. To Vima is historically the newspaper to which prominent politicians would most commonly provide interviews or write articles. Eleftherios Venizelos, Georgios Papandreou, Nikolaos Plastiras, Constantine Karamanlis and Andreas Papandreou are among those who have written for the newspaper.

Content
The newspaper features as columnists prominent journalists within the Greek media, including Yiannis Pretenderis and Vassilis Moulopoulos. Some of the newspaper's regular columnists include academics, university professors (such as Konstantinos Tsoukalas, Nikos Mouzelis, or Dimitris Psychogios, who contributes under a pen name), political scientists and a number of politicians. The Sunday edition of the newspaper used to be a staple of the Greek press, while today it competes both with the centre-right To Proto Thema and the centrist Kathimerini. To Vima, by Greek standards, was considered center-left and was politically aligned with the centrist (reformist) wing of the Greek social-democratic party PASOK. The majority of publications from within the Lambrakis Press fold were also politically aligned with the party. Some of its former editors have occupied key ministerial positions with the PASOK, such as Petros Efthimiou and Giorgos Romeos; it is also not uncommon for some of its journalists to stand for parliament, mainly with PASOK. But, after its acquisition by Alter Ego Media, the newspaper's have moved to the center and the center-right, while being linked to the centrist wing of New Democracy.

Circulation
To Vima had a circulation of 114,035 in October 2014.

References

External links
  - contains searchable index of the Sunday editions since 1996 
Digital edition of the daily and the Sunday edition  
Information about the site

Publications established in 1922
1922 establishments in Greece
Newspapers published in Athens
Greek-language newspapers
Weekly newspapers published in Greece